In mathematics, canonical singularities appear as singularities of the canonical model of a projective variety, and terminal singularities are special cases that appear as singularities of minimal models. Terminal singularities are important in the minimal model program because smooth minimal models do not always exist, and thus one must allow certain singularities, namely the terminal singularities.

Definition
Suppose that Y is a normal variety such that its canonical class KY is Q-Cartier, and let f:X→Y be a resolution of the singularities of Y. 
Then

where the sum is over the irreducible exceptional divisors, and the ai are rational numbers, called the discrepancies. 
 
Then the singularities of Y are called:
terminal if  ai > 0 for all i
canonical if  ai ≥ 0 for all i
log terminal if  ai > −1 for all i
log canonical if  ai ≥ −1 for all i.

Properties
The singularities of a projective variety V are canonical if the variety is normal, some power of the canonical line bundle of the non-singular part of V extends to a line bundle on V, and V has the same plurigenera as any resolution of its singularities. V has canonical singularities if and only if it is a relative canonical model.

The singularities of a projective variety V are terminal if the variety is normal, some power of the canonical line bundle of the non-singular part of V extends to a line bundle on V, and V  the pullback of any section of Vm vanishes along any codimension 1 component of the exceptional locus of a resolution of its singularities.

Classification in small  dimensions
Two dimensional terminal singularities are smooth.
If a variety has terminal singularities, then its singular points have codimension at least 3, and in particular in dimensions 1 and 2 all terminal singularities are smooth.

Two dimensional canonical singularities are the same as du Val singularities, and are analytically isomorphic to quotients
of C2 by finite subgroups of SL2(C).

Two dimensional log terminal singularities are  analytically isomorphic to quotients
of C2 by finite subgroups of GL2(C).

Pairs
More generally one can define these concepts for a pair  where  is a formal linear combination of prime divisors with rational coefficients such that  is -Cartier. The pair is called
terminal if Discrep
canonical if Discrep
klt (Kawamata log terminal) if Discrep and 
plt (purely log terminal) if Discrep
lc (log canonical) if Discrep.

References

Singularity theory
Algebraic geometry